Ines Doujak (born 1959, Klagenfurt) is an Austrian artist. Doujak graduated from Hochschule für angewandte Kunst in Vienna. She had her first solo exhibition in 2002 at the Vienna Secession  in 2002.  as part of which she took part in the Rainbow Parade of that year, the Viennese counterpart to the Christopher Street Day, for which she designed a float. Since then  has exhibited worldwide ever since working with a variety of media: collage, sculpture, photography, film, audio and installation.

Solo Shows 
The Württembergischer Kunstverein Stuttgart organized Not Dressed for Conquering in 2016–17 .

Collections
Her work is included in the collection of the Reina Sofia Museum, the Kunstmuseum Linz., the MUMOK (Museum of Modern Art), Vienna, and the Österreichische Galerie Belvedere, Vienna

References 

21st-century Austrian artists
1959 births
Living people